Pridemore is a surname. Notable people with the surname include:

Auburn Pridemore (1837–1900), nineteenth century politician and lawyer from Virginia
Brook Pridemore (born 1979), American singer-songwriter affiliated with the Antifolk scene in New York City
Craig Pridemore, Democratic Washington State Senator, representing the 49th district since 2005
Don Pridemore (born 1946), Wisconsin politician
J. S. Pridemore (born 1871), wealthy oil industrialist and member of the West Virginia House of Delegates
Tom Pridemore, former safety from West Virginia and a legislator
William Pridemore (born 1969), American criminologist